Jennifer Marie Frey (May 23, 1968 – March 26, 2016) was an American sportswriter.

Frey grew up in western New York, the child of a professor and a schoolteacher. She attended Allegany Central School and as a sophomore began interning for the Olean Times Herald. She went to college at Harvard University.

After college, Frey interned at the Detroit Free Press, then the Miami Herald. She went on to write for the Philadelphia Daily News and the New York Times. When interning in Detroit, she once approached Jack Morris for a clubhouse interview and he responded by stating “I don't talk to women when I'm naked unless they're on top of me or I'm on top of them,” The remark further attracted criticism when team president Bo Schembechler called it a predictable remark.

In 1995, she joined the Washington Post, writing for the sports page, then the style section. Writing of Frey in 1997, David Carr called her "a certified prodigy who can do it all: X's and O's, empathetic profiles, and hard takedowns when the situation requires it."

A single mother, Frey had one daughter. Frey was diagnosed with bipolar disorder. 

Frey died of organ failure due to alcoholism on March 26, 2016 at the age of 47.

See also
List of people with bipolar disorder
List of sports writers

References

American women journalists
Harvard University alumni
1968 births
2016 deaths
20th-century American non-fiction writers
21st-century American non-fiction writers
The New York Times people
The Washington Post journalists
Place of birth missing
Writers from New York (state)
Deaths from organ failure
People with bipolar disorder
Alcohol-related deaths in Washington
Sportswriters from New York (state)
20th-century American women writers
21st-century American women writers
American women sportswriters